Ankhen (The Eyes) is a 1968 Hindi spy thriller produced and directed by Ramanand Sagar. After the surprise big hit of Farz as a spy thriller, Sagar came out with a bigger budget film in the same genre, shot in many international locations. This was the first Hindi film shot in Beirut.

The film stars Mala Sinha, Dharmendra, Mehmood, Lalita Pawar, Jeevan and Madan Puri.

It was estimated to be the most profitable Indian film of 1968 in India.

Ankhen is considered to be a pioneer in Hindi spy films. It was initially planned to be shot when Dharmendra had just one film. But the director Ramanand Sagar had apprehensions of casting him since he was considered raw and was not yet a star; therefore, he recruited a huge star of the period, Mala Sinha, opposite him for marketing considerations. With the success of Phool Aur Paththar, Sagar decided to increase his budget and finalize Dharmendra as the leading man.

This film won Ramanand Sagar his only Filmfare award for Best Director.

Plot
Shortly after independence, India faces terrorists attacks in Assam, resulting in many deaths and casualties. A group of concerned citizens, who are not connected with the government, decide to do something to stop this carnage. While Salim is already at work in Beirut, his cover is blown, and he is shot dead. Now Sunil Mehra(Dharmendra) must travel to Beirut and take over. Once there, he meets a former flame, Meenakshi Mehta, and a female admirer by the name of Zenab.

The terrorists are headed by a man named Syed, who deputes one of his assistants, Madame, to spy on Sunil's dad, Diwan Chand Mehra, by posing as Mehra's daughter's aunt, forcing her to obey by abducting her son, Babloo, and holding him captive. Soon Syed and his associates, including Doctor X and Captain, find out all secrets of Mehra, as a result of which Sunil is trapped and held by Syed. Then Diwan's world is shattered when Meenakshi telephonically informs him that Sunil has been killed. The question remains what will happen to Babloo, Diwan, and the rest of the concerned citizens, especially when they have become vulnerable due to Madame's presence in their very household.

Cast
 Dharmendra as Sunil
 Mala Sinha as Meenakshi Mehta
 Kumkum as Sunanda
 Sujit Kumar as Nadeem
 Mehmood as Mehmood
 Parduman Randhawa as Akram
 Amarnath as Salim 
 Lalita Pawar...Madam / fake aunt
 Daisy Irani...Lily
 Nazir Hussain as Major Diwanchand
 Jeevan...Doctor
 Madan Puri...Captain
 Dhumal...Studio Owner
 Zeb Rehman...Princess Zehnab
 Madhumati...Madhu (Dancer)
 Sajjan (actor) ... Syed, Boss in Beirut
 Master Ratan...Babloo
 M. B. Shetty...Bald Guard
 Hiralal (actor) ... Sheikh (Jewellery dealer)

Songs
The music is by Ravi and the lyrics by Sahir Ludhianvi.
 "Milti Hai Zindagi Mein Mohabbat" - Lata Mangeshkar
 "Gairon Pe Karam" - Lata Mangeshkar
 "De Data Ke Naam Tujhko Allah Rakhe"- Manna Dey and Asha Bhosle
 "Loot Ja" - Asha Bhosle, Kamal Barot and Usha Mangeshkar
 "Meri Sunle Aaj" - Lata Mangeshkar
 "Us Mulk Ki Sarhad Ko" - Mohammed Rafi

Awards

Trivia
 The hotel in which Dharmendra stays in Beirut is Carlton Hotel, built in 1960 and was demolished in 2008 for some new project.
 (Blooper) In the climax scene, the Indian army is shown attacking the headquarter of Captain & Tiger. One of the Jeeps they are driving has 'Sandhu Transport Co' written on it.

References

External links
 
 Aankhen (1968) at Teleport City

1968 films
Indian action thriller films
1960s Hindi-language films
1960s action thriller films
Indian spy thriller films
Films directed by Ramanand Sagar
Films scored by Ravi
Films shot in Lebanon
1960s spy thriller films